Ramune Pekarskyte (born 5 October 1980) is a Lithuanian-Icelandic handball player for Haukar of Úrvalsdeild kvenna, and the Icelandic national team. Although born in Lithuania, she gained Icelandic citizenship on 14 June 2012 and has been available for the Icelandic team since then.

Career
Pekarskyte played for Haukar from 2003 to 2010 when she joined Levanger Handball. In April 2013, she signed with SönderjyskE in Denmark. In 2014, Pekarskyte signed with Le Havre AC of the French championship league. In 2015 she signed back with Haukar in the Icelandic Úrvalsdeild kvenna, where she played until 2017 when she signed with Stjarnan. For the 2017–18 season, she led Stjarnan with 109 goals 19 games.

In August 2018, Pekarskyte signed back with Haukar.

References

1980 births
Living people
Icelandic female handball players
People from Pasvalys
Haukar women's handball players
Stjarnan women's handball players